The 2022–23 Basketball Cup of Serbia is the 17th season of the Serbian 2nd-tier men's cup tournament.

Finalists Spartak Office Shoes and Vojvodina got qualified for the 2023 Radivoj Korać Cup.

Bracket

Quarterfinals
All times are local UTC+1.

Morava v Spartak Office Shoes

Čačak 94 Quantox v OKK Beograd

Zdravlje v Mladost MaxBet

Sloboda v Vojvodina

Semifinals
All times are local UTC+1.

Spartak Office Shoes v OKK Beograd

Zdravlje v Vojvodina

Final

See also 
 2022–23 Radivoj Korać Cup
 2022–23 Second Men's League of Serbia
 2022–23 Basketball League of Serbia

References

External links 
 

Basketball Cup of Serbia
Cup